KKOZ (AM) & KKOZ-FM are simulcasting radio stations broadcasting on the frequencies of 1430 kHz and 92.1 MHz.  KKOZ AM & FM are owned by Corum Industries, Inc.  1430 kHz is a regional broadcast frequency.

The format is News, Talk & Information plus Country music and the stations are located in Ava, Missouri.

KKOZ is an affiliate of the Kansas City Chiefs radio network.

References

External links 

KOZ (AM)